"De Punta a Punta" (From End to End) is a single by Salvadoran singer Álvaro Torres released on 1986 through Fonovisa Records as part of Torres' seventh studio album Tres. The song was written by Torres, produced by Enrique Elizondo and it was recorded in George Tobin Studios, North Hollywood, CA. "De Punta a Punta", along with "Mi Amor Por Ti" where the most successful songs of his album Tres.

At the beginning, "De Punta a Punta" was not well received by some audiences because of the lyrics content, which depicts an erotic encounter between a man and a woman. Later, some people realize about the song potential, among them radio host Betty Pino, who raised the popularity of the song in United States and Latin America.

"De Punta a Punta" was covered by José Luis Rodríguez in 1990 for his album Esta Vez. His version peaked at number 34 on the Billboard Hot Latin Songs chart.

Track listing

Personnel 
Credits adapted from Tres liner notes.

Vocals

 Álvaro Torres – lead vocals

Musicians

 David White – arrangements

Production

 Enrique Elizondo – production
 Alan Hirshberg  – engineering

Recording

 Recorded at George Tobin Studios, North Hollywood, CA

References

External links
Lyrics of this song at Musixmatch

1986 singles
1991 singles
Álvaro Torres songs
José Luis Rodríguez (singer) songs